Cortner is an unincorporated community in Bedford County, in the U.S. state of Tennessee.

History
A post office called Cortner was established in 1885, and remained in operation until 1943. The community had a depot on the Nashville and Chattanooga Railway. A variant name was "Cortners Station".

References

Unincorporated communities in Bedford County, Tennessee
Unincorporated communities in Tennessee